

pb-pc
PBZ
PCE

pe

pec-peg
pecazine (INN)
pecilocin (INN)
pecocycline (INN)
Pediamycin
Pediapred
Pediatric Advil
Pediatric Lta Kit
Pediazole
Pediotic
pefloxacin (INN)
peforelin (INN)
Peg-Lyte
pegacaristim (INN)
pegaldesleukin (INN)
pegamotecan (USAN)
Peganone
pegaptanib sodium (USAN)
pegaspargase (INN)
pegdinetanib (USAN)
pegfilgrastim (INN)
peginesatide (USAN)
peginterferon alfa-2a (USAN)
peginterferon alfa-2b (INN)
pegloticase (USAN)
pegmusirudin (INN)
pegnartograstim (INN)
pegorgotein (INN)
pegsitacase (USAN)
pegsunercept (USAN)
pegvisomant (INN)

pel-pem
pelanserin (INN)
peldesine (INN)
peliglitazar (USAN)
peliomycin (INN)
pelitinib (USAN)
pelitrexol (USAN)
pelretin (INN)
pelrinone (INN)
pelubiprofen (INN)
pemedolac (INN)
pemerid (INN)
pemetrexed (INN)
pemirolast (INN)
pemoline (INN)
pempidine (INN)
pemtumomab (INN)

pen
Pen-Vee K

pena-penn
penamecillin (INN)
Penapar-VK
Penbritin
penbutolol (INN)
penciclovir (INN)
pendecamaine (INN)
pendetide (INN)
Penecort
Penetrex
penfluridol (INN)
penflutizide (INN)
pengitoxin (INN)
Penhexal VK (Hexal Australia) [Au]. Redirects to penicillin.
penicillamine (INN)
penicillinase (INN)
penimepicycline (INN)
penimocycline (INN)
penirolol (INN)
Penlac
penmesterol (INN)
Penntuss

peno-penp
penoctonium bromide (INN)
penprostene (INN)

pent

penta
pentabamate (INN)
Pentacarinat
Pentacef
pentacynium chloride (INN)
pentaerithrityl tetranitrate (INN)
pentafluranol (INN)
pentagastrin (INN)
pentagestrone (INN)
pentalamide (INN)
Pentam
pentamethonium bromide (INN)
pentamidine (INN)
pentamorphone (INN)
pentamoxane (INN)
pentapiperide (INN)
pentapiperium metilsulfate (INN)
pentaquine (INN)
Pentasa
pentazocine (INN)

pente-penti
pentetic acid (INN)
pentetrazol (INN)
pentetreotide (INN)
Penthrane
penthrichloral (INN)
pentiapine (INN)
Pentids
pentifylline (INN)
pentigetide (INN)
pentisomicin (INN)
pentisomide (INN)
pentizidone (INN)

pento-pentr
pentobarbital (INN)
Pentolair
pentolonium tartrate (INN)
pentomone (INN)
pentopril (INN)
pentorex (INN)
pentosan polysulfate sodium (INN)
pentostatin (INN)
Pentothal
pentoxifylline (INN)
Pentoxil
pentoxyverine (INN)
pentrinitrol (INN)

pep
Pepcid (McNeil Laboratories)
peplomycin (INN)
pepstatin (INN)
Peptavlon (Wyeth)

per

pera-perh
peraclopone (INN)
peradoxime (INN)
perafensine (INN)
peralopride (INN)
peramivir (USAN)
perampanel (USAN)
peraquinsin (INN)
perastine (INN)
peratizole (INN)
perbufylline (INN)
Perchloracap
Percocet
Percodan
Percorten
perfluamine (INN)
perflubrodec (USAN)
perflubron (INN)
perflubutane (USAN)
perfluorobutane (INN)
perflunafene (INN)
perfomedil (INN)
perfosfamide (INN)
pergolide (INN)
Pergonal
perhexiline (INN)

peri-pert
Periactin
periciazine (INN)
Peridex
perifosine (INN)
perimetazine (INN)
perindopril (INN)
perindoprilat (INN)
Periochip
Periogard
Periostat
perisoxal (INN)
perlapine (INN)
Permapen
Permax
permethrin (INN)
Permitil
perospirone (INN)
perphenazine (INN)
Persantine
persilic acid (INN)
Pertofrane
pertuzumab (USAN)
perzinfotel (USAN)

pet-pex
pethidine (INN)
petrichloral (INN)
pexacerfont (USAN)
pexantel (INN)
pexelizumab (INN)
pexiganan (INN)